A Cat Abroad is the second short novel by Peter Gethers that documents his life with his cat Norton, a Scottish Fold. It was preceded by The Cat Who Went to Paris and followed by The Cat Who'll Live Forever: The Final Adventures of Norton, the Perfect Cat, and His Imperfect Human. A Cat Abroad documents Gether's and Norton's time living in a foreign country and describes not only their relationship and experiences but also the intricacies and difficulties of living in a small hamlet in a foreign country.

Scottish Fold
1993 American novels
American autobiographical novels
Novels about cats
American memoirs